Gajac is a village on the Adriatic Sea on the island of Pag. There is a small permanent population and a seasonal tourist population (from in and out of Croatia who lease or buy condos).

Nearby locations include Zrće Beach, a well-known partygoers destination, and Kolansko blato, an ornithological reserve.

References

Populated places in Lika-Senj County
Pag (island)
Populated coastal places in Croatia